Carry On Kesar  is an Indian Gujarati social comedy film directed by Vipul Mehta. It is a socially relevant film that talks of a traditional elderly childless couple deciding to have a baby. It is a debut Gujarati film of actress Supriya Pathak Kapur. The cast includes Darshan Jariwala, Avani Modi and Rittesh Mobh in the lead roles.

Plot 
Shyamji (Darshan Jariwala) and Kesar Patel (Supriya Pathak), a traditional Gujarati elderly childless couple live in a small town in Gujarat. A fashion designer based in Paris, Annie (Avani Modi) comes across Kesar's artistic work and makes arrangement to learn the art from her. However, things don't go as planned and a twist of fate prompts Kesar to confront her past. The couple decides to have a child at an age where most couples are grandparents.

Cast
Supriya Pathak Kapur as Kesar Patel
Darshan Jariwala as Shyamji Patel 
Avani Modi as Annie 
Rittesh Mobh as Dr. Pratik Joshi
Arachan Trivedi as Odha Kaka 
Bhaskar Bhojak as Hitesh Patel
Parth Thakar as Mitesh Patel 
Amish Tanna as Jignesh
Olamilekan Akanbi Jason as John

Release
Film released on 17 February 2017.

Reception

The Times of India reviewed positively saying, "A complete family movie with impressive performances by Supriya Pathak and Darshan Jariwala." BuddyBits also reviewed positively stating it to be one of the must watch Gujarati films.

References

External links
 

2017 films
2017 comedy-drama films
Films shot in Gujarat
Indian comedy-drama films
2010s Gujarati-language films